Abisoye Ajayi-Akinfolarin (born Abisoye Abosede Ajayi, 19 May 1985) is a social impact entrepreneur and human development expert whose work cuts across education, youth development, and public leadership.

She is the Founder and Chief Executive Officer of Pearls Africa Youth Foundation, a non-profit organization focused on educating young girls and women in underserved communities through providing access to technology proficiency and mentoring for the overarching purpose of economic independence. In the year 2018, in November, Ajayi-Akinfolarin was named one of the top ten CNN Heroes. She was listed as one of BBC 100 Women in Tech in the same month.

Abisoye is a shrewd professional with years of experience in Information Technology, Computer Programming, Data Analysis, and sustaining devotion to creating a difference.



Early life and education 
Abisoye was born into the family of late Chief James Olaniyi Ajayi and Christina Titilayo Ajayi in Akure, Ondo State in Nigeria. She attended the Nigerian Institute of Information Technology (NIIT), she further attended the University of Lagos where she earned her Bachelor's Degree in Business Administration, a course based on core business functions that accentuate the application of information technology, teamwork, and problem-solving.  Abisoye is a Mason fellow with a Mid-Career Masters of Public Administration, an alumnus of the Harvard Kennedy School. She is also an Adrian Cheng Fellow, a fellowship for change-makers committed to addressing pressing social problems in new and creative ways.

Professional career 
Ajayi-Akinfolarin started her career in EDP Audit and Security Associates as a trainee consultant, 3 years later she worked as a full-time Associate Consultant and Data Analyst for 5 years.

Ajayi-Akinfolarin founded Pearls Africa Youth Foundation in 2015, an NGO that is focused on stimulating the cause and advancement of susceptible young girls and women.

Ajayi-Akinfolarin believes strongly in the importance of girls and women being not only consumers of technology solutions or products but also creators. Thus these ladies and women are empowered to solve problems in their communities and develop a value for themselves, this gave birth to GirlsCoding, a flagship program of Pearls Africa. Wanting to help close that gap and encourage more women in her field,  Ajayi-Akinfolarin established her own non-profit organization.

In 2012, Ajayi-Akinfolarin founded Pearls Africa Youth Foundation, a Non-Governmental Organization that assists girls in developing technology skills through various programs including; GirlsCoding, G.C Mentors, GirlsInSTEM and Empowered Hands. Since 2012, the organization has trained over 10,000 young women to code.

Awards and recognition 
 CNN Heroes honoree, 2018
BBC 100 Women, 2018
ONE's 2018 Women of the Year Awards

References

External links
official website

Nigerian women's rights activists
Nigerian women in business
BBC 100 Women
Living people
1985 births
Yoruba women in business
Yoruba women activists
Nigerian social entrepreneurs
University of Lagos alumni
People from Akure
Harvard Kennedy School alumni
Mason Fellows